Matthias Valkiers  (born 8 April 1990) is a Belgian male volleyball player. He was part of the Belgium men's national volleyball team at the 2014 FIVB Volleyball Men's World Championship in Poland.

References

1990 births
Living people
Belgian men's volleyball players
Place of birth missing (living people)
PAOK V.C. players
Belgian expatriates in Greece
Belgian expatriate sportspeople in Romania
Expatriate volleyball players in Greece
Expatriate volleyball players in Romania